Brisbane City was an electoral district of the Legislative Assembly in the Australian state of Queensland from 1873 to 1878.

Based in inner Brisbane, north of the Brisbane River, it was first created as a single member constituency for the 1873 colonial election, formed as a result of the abolition of the three member constituency Town of Brisbane. It was abolished at the 1878 colonial election and replaced by the new dual member constituency of North Brisbane.

Members for Brisbane City

See also
 Electoral district of Brisbane (Queensland), which existed 1912 to 1977
 Electoral districts of Queensland
 Members of the Queensland Legislative Assembly by year
 :Category:Members of the Queensland Legislative Assembly by name

References

Former electoral districts of Queensland
Constituencies established in 1873
Constituencies disestablished in 1878
1873 establishments in Australia
1878 disestablishments in Australia